The Security State Bank in Eskridge, Kansas is a bank building built in 1906 with a Romanesque style entrance corner.  It was listed on the National Register of Historic Places in 1982.

It was built by E.L. Hopkins with stone-masonry work by K.O. Ericsson.  In 1982, it was considered the most prominent building in Eskridge.

References

Bank buildings on the National Register of Historic Places in Kansas
Commercial buildings completed in 1906
Buildings and structures in Wabaunsee County, Kansas
National Register of Historic Places in Wabaunsee County, Kansas
Romanesque Revival architecture in Kansas
1906 establishments in Kansas